Year 368 (CCCLXVIII) was a leap year starting on Tuesday (link will display the full calendar) of the Julian calendar. At the time, it was known as the Year of the Consulship of Augustus and Valens (or, less frequently, year 1121 Ab urbe condita). The denomination 368 for this year has been used since the early medieval period, when the Anno Domini calendar era became the prevalent method in Europe for naming years.

Events 
 By place 

 Roman Empire 
 Spring – Emperor Valentinian I and his 8-year-old son, Gratian, cross the Rhine with an army into Alamannic territory. He defeats the Alemanni and burns food stores along the border. A temporary peace is signed  with Macrian, king of the Bucinobantes, and Valentinian returns to his capital Augusta Treverorum (modern Trier).
 Great Conspiracy: Picts, Scotti and Saxons reach Roman London and plunder the city. Theodosius, a general (Comes Britanniarum), is sent with a relief force to Britannia. He marches from Richborough, Kent, to deal with the invaders.
 Winter – The barbarians are driven back to their homelands, Hadrian's Wall is retaken and order returns to the Roman diocese. Theodosius reorganises the abandoned forts and mounts punitive expeditions in Hibernia (Ireland).

 Asia 
 An earthquake strikes Nicaea (modern Turkey).

Births 
 Eustochium, Christian Desert Mother and saint (approximate date)
 Juqu Mengxun, Chinese prince of the Northern Liang (d. 433)
 Philostorgius, Anomoean church historian and writer (b. 439)

Deaths 
 July 7 – Maternien, Christian bishop and saint

Date unknown
 Caesarius of Nazianzus, Roman physician and politician
 Vulcacius Rufinus, Roman prefect, consul and politician
 Yue Wan, Chinese general and politician of Former Yan

References